The Shenandoah Valley Railroad  is a shortline railroad operating   of track between Staunton and Pleasant Valley, Virginia. The railroad interchanges with CSX and Buckingham Branch in Staunton and Norfolk Southern in Pleasant Valley. The railroad was purchased from Norfolk Southern in 1993 and is currently operated by the Durbin and Greenbrier Valley Railroad.

Gallery

References

Virginia railroads
Spin-offs of the Norfolk Southern Railway
Non-operating common carrier freight railroads in the United States
Transportation in Augusta County, Virginia
Transportation in Rockingham County, Virginia
Transportation in Staunton, Virginia